Karl Gercens is an American horticulturist.  Gercens' experimentation with plant types and growing methods in the Southern United States sparked an interest in the cultivation of ornamental plants.  

Born in Mississippi, Gercens received a degree in Ornamental Horticulture from Mississippi State University.  He then held  internships at Walt Disney World in Orlando, Florida and Filoli Estate in Woodside, California.

Gercens has worked for over 25 years at Longwood Gardens in Kennett Square, Pennsylvania. He has influenced the design, installation, and maintenance of the facility's large conservatory displays  

Gercens is known for using a pallet of colored foliage trees, shrubs, and perennials. He has given lectures at the San Francisco Flower & Garden Show, the Northwest Flower and Garden Show, the Cincinnati Flower Show, the Philadelphia Flower Show, the Capital District Garden and Flower Show and the Southeastern Flower Show.  Gercens has visited over 450  gardens in America and has catalogued images of gardens from more than 20 countries.

Sources
https://web.archive.org/web/20090309033030/http://www.theflowershow.com/attractions/lecturesdemos2009.html
http://www.flowershow.com/index.php?id=80&type=98
http://www.washingtonpost.com/wp-dyn/content/article/2007/11/28/AR2007112800676.html
https://web.archive.org/web/20090131232331/http://longwoodgardens.org/InstructorBios.html
http://www.pjstar.com/home_garden/x834867293/Many-arid-looking-succulents-right-at-home-here
http://www.philly.com/philly/classifieds/real_estate/20080425_Can_t_contain_yourself.html?text=reg&c=y
http://www.gardensmart.tv/pages.php?page=2&subpage=2006_show3

Year of birth missing (living people)
Living people
American horticulturists
Mississippi State University alumni